Shades Apart is an American alternative rock musical group from Bridgewater Township, New Jersey. They are best known for their US radio hit "Valentine", "Stranger by the Day" and their cover of the hit song "Tainted Love."

History 
The band formed in 1988, self-releasing an album that year; two EPs followed in 1992 and 1993. 1995's full-length, Save It, produced by Bill Stevenson and Stephen Egerton, resulted in some media exposure due to the success of their cover of Gloria Jones' "Tainted Love". The song would later be featured multiple times in the 2004 movie She's Too Young. After another independent release in 1997, the band signed to Universal, who released Eyewitness in 1999 and Sonic Boom in 2001. In 1999, the single "Valentine" peaked at #31 on Billboard'''s Mainstream Rock Tracks chart. It also appeared on the Active Rock, Heritage Rock, and Mainstream Rock Audience charts. Their song "Stranger By The Day" featured in the film American Pie and is on the soundtrack.

The band has since been seen playing in various venues and are always writing new material.  Their last show was on 11.09.19 at The Crossroads in Garwood, New Jersey.

 Members 
Mark Vecchiarelli – guitar, vocals
Kevin Lynch – bass, background vocals
Ed Brown – drums

 Discography Shades Apart (Wishingwell Records, 1988)Dude Danger EP (Sunspot Records, 1992)Neon (Skene! Records, 1993)Save It (Revelation, 1995)
"Tainted Love" CD single (1995, Revelation 40 PR1)Seeing Things (Revelation, 1997)Eyewitness (Universal, 1999)Sonic Boom (Universal, 2001)Eternal Echo (Hellminded Records, 2020)

 Compilation appearances In-Flight Program CD (1997, Revelation REV050)
Track 05 – "Fearless"Music from the Motion Picture American Pie CD (1999, Uptown/Universal)
Track 08 – "Stranger by the Day"Revelation 100: 15 Year Retrospective Of Rare Recordings CD/LP (2002, Revelation REV100)
Track 07 – "Under The Sun"Violent World: A Tribute to The Misfits CD (1997, Caroline)
Track 03 – "20 Eyes"The Blasting Room'' CD (2000, Owned & Operated Recordings – O&O 008-2)
Track 03 – "Blame"

References

External links 
Shades Apart on the Revelation Records website

Musical groups from New Jersey
Revelation Records artists
Equal Vision Records artists